Joaquín Bernardo Guillén González (born 12 January 1968) is a retired Costa Rican football player.

He played most of his career at hometown club Alajuelense.

Club career
Guillén totalled 331 league matches for Liga. In summer 1998 he joined compatriots Rónald Gómez and Richard Smith at Guatemalan side Municipal. He had a few seasons back at home with Santos de Guápiles, moved to Cartaginés in January 2001 and joined Carmelita in summer 2001.

International career
Guillén made his debut for Costa Rica in a November 1991 friendly match against the United States and earned a total of 20 caps, scoring no goals. He represented his country in 2 FIFA World Cup qualification matches and played at the 1997 UNCAF Nations Cup, the 1998 CONCACAF Gold Cup and the 1997 Copa América.

His final international was a February 1998 CONCACAF Gold Cup match against the United States.

References

External links
 

1968 births
Living people
People from Alajuela
Association football midfielders
Costa Rican footballers
Costa Rica international footballers
1997 Copa América players
1998 CONCACAF Gold Cup players
L.D. Alajuelense footballers
C.S.D. Municipal players
Santos de Guápiles footballers
C.S. Cartaginés players
A.D. Carmelita footballers
Costa Rican expatriate footballers
Expatriate footballers in Guatemala
Liga FPD players